Ken Griffey Jr.'s Slugfest is a baseball video game developed by Angel Studios and published by Nintendo for the Nintendo 64. It was released in May 1999 only in North America. A Game Boy Color port developed by Software Creations was released in June 1999. Featuring real-life player Ken Griffey Jr., it is a sequel to Major League Baseball Featuring Ken Griffey Jr., released for the Nintendo 64, which itself was a sequel to Ken Griffey Jr. Presents Major League Baseball and Ken Griffey Jr.'s Winning Run, both released for the Super NES.

This version of the game contains actual player names, unlike the original. It contains Season, Exhibition, World Series and Home Run Derby modes. It also has familiar background music playing throughout the game.

Gameplay

The batting feature in this game is set up differently from most other baseball video games. The batter is given an elongated oval shape to control and in order for the batter to make contact with the ball, he must wait for the pitch location and then move the oval to the location of the pitch to make contact. Each batter will have a different sized oval or hitting zone depending on how strong of a hitter he is. This feature was originally developed in Major League Baseball Featuring Ken Griffey Jr. and carried over into this game with slight modifications.

The fielding portion of this game makes use of the c-directional pad on the Nintendo 64 controller. As a fielder, you must run to the ball using the analog stick and then choose the correct c-button for the base to which you would like to throw. The controller has four c-buttons: c-up, c-left, c-right, and c-down and each of these represent a different base. Each c-button represents the base that would correspond with its location on the controller. For example, c-right represents first base, c-up represents second base, c-left represents third base, and c-down represents home plate.

This game uses simple controls for pitching that are very similar to the controls of other baseball video games of the time. Before the pitch, there will be a menu that will show all available pitches that the pitcher can throw. In order to throw a certain pitch, you must press the button that is next to the pitch you would like to throw. The strike zone will be shown by a white rectangular box and any pitch that is located in the box will be a strike. Also, while the ball is being thrown, the pitcher may use the analog stick to move the pitch in any direction. There are several different pitches that can be thrown. They are: fastball, super fastball, change up, super change up, knuckleball, curveball, slider, and screwball. Every pitcher has his own unique set of pitches and no pitcher can throw all the pitches. The speed of the pitches can range anywhere from 37 mph to 103 mph.

This game allows the player to select pitchers of a team from the bullpen or rotation. This game also allows the player to select different pitches to be thrown, based on each real life pitchers' abilities. The player of this game may create custom baseball players with different pitches, size, strength, and stamina. The player may also select the team, stadium, and choose between day or night and home or away games.

Reception

The Nintendo 64 version received favorable reviews, while the Game Boy Color version received mixed reviews, according to the review aggregation website GameRankings. Next Generation called the former version "one of the best arcade baseball titles in a while. Sure, the graphics pale in comparison to Acclaim's All-Star Baseball 2000, and realism is notably absent, but if you're more concerned about white-knuckled multiplayer games and .500 batting averages than pitching duels and squeeze plays, this is your game."

References

External links

1999 video games
Baseball video games
Ken Griffey Jr. video games
Game Boy Color games
Multiplayer and single-player video games
Nintendo 64 games
North America-exclusive video games
Software Creations games
Video games developed in the United States